SVB may refer to:

Groups, organizations, companies
 Städtische Verkehrsbetriebe Bern, a public transport operator in Bern, Switzerland
 Surinaamse Voetbal Bond, the governing body of soccer football in Suriname
 SVB Cup, Surinamese soccer competition
 Silicon Valley Bank (1983-2023), a former commercial bank in the US
 SVB Securities, an investment bank
 SVB Financial Group, a holding company

Other uses
 Setouchi Volcanic Belt, a Miocene volcanic belt in southwestern Japan
 Ulau-Suain language of Papua New Guinea (ISO 639-3 code: svb)
 Polikarpov SVB, a Soviet aircraft
 Shavenbaby (svb), a fly gene encoding a transcription factor for making hair

See also

 
 Silicon Valley BART extension, rapid transit system in California
 Sri Venkateswara Bhakti Channel, a Telegu language Hindu devotional TV channel
 sub (disambiguation)